Automated Trusted Information Exchange (ATIX) is a computer database containing homeland security and terrorist threat information, which is part of the U.S. government's Regional Information Sharing Systems (RISS) program.

See also 
 Homeland Security Information Network
 Joint Regional Information Exchange System
 Multistate Anti-Terrorism Information Exchange
 National Criminal Intelligence Sharing Plan
 Regional Information Sharing Systems
 Surveillance

References

United States Department of Homeland Security
Government databases in the United States
Terrorism databases